De Heuvel is the name of several locations in the Netherlands:

 De Heuvel, Gelderland
 De Heuvel, North Brabant

See also:
 De Heuvels, a hamlet near Kampen